Stelvia de Jesus Pascoal (born 20 October 2002) is an Angolan handball player. She plays left back for Atlético Petróleos de Luanda and the Angola women's handball team.

Career 
Part of the Angolan team that won the 2021 African Women's Handball Championship in Yaoundé, she qualified to represent Angola in the Olympics.

2020 Tokyo Summer Olympics 
Pascoal participated in the 2020 Tokyo Summer Olympics, where the Angola women's handball team ranked 10th.

References 

2002 births
Angolan female handball players
Living people
Handball players at the 2020 Summer Olympics
Olympic handball players of Angola